Capraia Isola is a comune (municipality) in the Province of Livorno in the Italian region of Tuscany, located on the island of the same name of the Tuscan Archipelago.

See also
 Capraia
 Tuscan Archipelago
 Punta Ferraione Lighthouse

References

External links
Capraia Isola — Tourist information
Capraia Isola — Tourist information

Cities and towns in Tuscany
 
Populated coastal places in Italy